The 1813 crossing of the Blue Mountains was the expedition led by Gregory Blaxland, William Lawson and William Charles Wentworth, which became the first successful crossing of the Blue Mountains in New South Wales by European settlers. The crossing enabled the settlers to access and use the land west of the mountains for farming, and made possible the establishment of Australia's first inland colonial settlement at Bathurst.

Background
The European settlement at Sydney Cove, established in 1788 after the arrival of the First Fleet, grew rapidly. By the early 19th century, the Blue Mountains had become a barrier to the expansion of the colony, which required more farming land to meet its needs, particularly after the droughts of 1812 and 1813. The local indigenous people knew at least two routes by which to cross the mountains. The first was along Bilpin Ridge, later followed by Archibald Bell with the assistance of the local Darug people (now the location of Bells Line of Road), and the second was along Coxs River. Until 1813 however, the settlers remained unaware of how to cross the mountains despite several attempts, including two by Blaxland himself. Early in 1813 Blaxland, who wanted more grazing land, obtained the approval of Governor Lachlan Macquarie and approached Lawson and Wentworth to secure their participation in a new exploratory expedition following the mountain ridges.

Gregory Blaxland 
Gregory Blaxland was born Sunday, 17 June 1778 in Kent, England. He sailed for Australia on Wednesday, 1 September 1805 with his wife, three children, two servants, an overseer, a few sheep, seed, tools, groceries, and clothing. When he reached Sydney he sold many of these items and made a profit which enabled him to buy eighty head of cattle so that he could breed cattle and sell the meat. He located 1,600 hectares of land that the government had promised to new settlers as well as forty convict servants and established his farm. He was also one of the first people to plant grapes in Australia and make wine, for which he was awarded a silver medal and later a gold one from the Royal Society of Arts, London.

The town of Blaxland is named after him.

William Lawson 
William Lawson was born in England, where he later trained to become a surveyor. He migrated to Sydney, Australia, arriving in 1800. He was an officer in the New South Wales Corp and owned land where he raised many cattle and sheep. He was invited to join the 1813 expedition with Gregory Blaxland.

The town of Lawson is also named after him.

William Charles Wentworth 
William Charles Wentworth was born in Australia to Irish parents.

The town of Wentworth Falls is named after him.

Expedition

Blaxland, Wentworth and Lawson led an expedition party, which included four servants, four pack horses and five dogs. Two of the four men who assisted the party have been identified as James Burne (or Burnes), a guide and kangaroo hunter, and Samuel Fairs, a convict who arrived in Australia in 1810. The two others, also thought to be convicts, remain unidentified.

The party left from Blaxland's South Creek farm near the modern suburb of St Marys in western Sydney, on 11 May 1813 and crossed the Nepean River later that day. They made their way over the mountains, following the ridges, and completed the crossing in 21 days. The explorers' success has been attributed to their methodical approach and decision to travel on the ridges instead of through the valleys. The three explorers and two of their servants would set out each day, leaving the other two men at their campsite, and mark out a trail, before turning back later in the day to cut a path for the horses and allow the rest of the party to progress.

The group first saw the plains beyond the mountains from Mount York. They continued on to Mount Blaxland 25 km south of the site of Lithgow, on the western side of the mountains. From this point Blaxland declared there was enough forest or grassland "to support the stock of the colony for thirty years", while Lawson called it "the best watered Country of any I have seen in the Colony". The party then turned back, making the return journey in just six days.

Journals of the party

All three explorers wrote an account of their expedition. Blaxland was the only one to publish his account, Journal of a Tour of Discovery Across the Blue Mountains, which he did in 1823 during a return visit to England. His journal, written in the third person, records their progress in detail, including their reasons for believing they had achieved their goals and deciding to turn back: 

Wentworth's journal indicates his inspired impressions of the landscape:

Lawson, as a trained surveyor, kept detailed notes about the route itself including the distances covered each day, as well as his impressions of the landscape. He recorded on 22 May:

Aftermath

In recognition of the successful crossing, all three explorers were rewarded by Macquarie with a grant of 1000 acres of land west of the mountains. Blaxland later claimed to have led the expedition, however records from the time of the crossing imply that they were joint leaders.

Surveyor-General George William Evans was dispatched by Macquarie in November 1813 to follow the path taken and travel further to determine the best route to access the arable farmland. Evans continued past Mount Blaxland to the Macquarie and Lachlan Rivers and the site of modern Bathurst. Upon his return, he was rewarded with 1000 acres of land in Tasmania. Macquarie then commissioned William Cox in July 1814 to construct a road, following the path taken by the three explorers and extended by Evans. Cox's team of convict workers completed the job in six months and Cox was rewarded by Macquarie with a grant of 2000 acres of land near the site chosen by Macquarie for Bathurst. Macquarie travelled along the new road, naming it the Great Western Road, in 1815. Artist John Lewin accompanied Macquarie on the tour.

The colonial expansion into the lands of the Wiradjuri nation, west of the Blue Mountains, led to the Bathurst war.

Commemorations

The crossing and the three explorers have been commemorated in a number of ways, including: 
 Several memorials to the explorers have been erected along the route they followed.
 Events to mark the centenary included a luncheon at Mount Victoria. 
 Frank Walker, then President of the Royal Australian Historical Society, published a compilation of articles about the crossing and photographs of the Blue Mountains in time for the centenary 
 Three towns in the Blue Mountains are named after the explorers: Blaxland, Lawson, and Wentworth Falls.
 Federal electorates were named after two of the explorers: Division of Blaxland and Division of Wentworth.
 For the 150th anniversary, a 1963 postage stamp featured an image of the expedition. 
 Events to mark the bicentenary in 2013 included the Blue Mountains Blue Wave walking party following the route taken by the expedition, a flypast involving 70 aircraft, a silver coin issued by the Royal Australian Mint, and performances of a play written by a descendant of Blaxland.

It has been claimed that Blaxland, Wentworth and Lawson may have carved their initials into the tree now referred to as the Explorers tree, located about 5 kilometres west of Katoomba. This claim is not universally supported and the tree is not specifically mentioned in the journals kept by the explorers, although they did mark trees to record their route.

Locations

 South Creek Farm  
 Caley's Repulse 
 Mount York  
 Mount Blaxland  
 Wentworth's Sugarloaf  
 Lawson's Sugarloaf

See also
European exploration of Australia
History of New South Wales
Prehistory of Australia
Bathurst war

References

External links
Blaxland's journal – record at the State Library of NSW
Blaxland's journal images of published journal (1870) – at the State Library of NSW
Blaxland's journal (digitised) at the University of Sydney
Blaxland's journal (digitised) at the University of Adelaide 
Lawson's journal (original) (digitised) at the State Library of NSW
Lawson's journal (html)(digitised) at Gutenberg
Wentworth's journal (digitised) at the State Library of NSW
Journal of Gregory Blaxland, edited by Frank Walker in 1913 at Project Gutenberg Australia
Blue Mountains Blue Wave "Celebration of Mountain Life" 200th Bicentenary celebrations
Blue Mountains Local History blog

Exploration of Australia
History of the Blue Mountains (New South Wales)
1813 in Australia
19th century in New South Wales
Australian expeditions
May 1813 events
June 1813 events